Thorncliffe Cemetery and Crematorium (also known as 'Barrow Cemetery/Crematorium') is a 66-acre graveyard located on Devonshire Road in the Ormsgill ward of Barrow-in-Furness, Cumbria, England.

The cemetery opened in 1872 and a crematorium was added to the site in 1962. A total of 189 identified war casualties are buried there, while over 40,000 cremations have taken place at Thorncliffe. Operated by Barrow Borough Council, records of burials and cremations can be found at the Cemetery Office as well as the council's archives at Barrow Main Public Library.

The cemetery's gatehouse, north lodge and Roman Catholic chapel were all completed in the early 1870s and have Grade II listed status.

Notable burials
 Stephen Fitzpatrick – musician for Her's
 Sir James Ramsden – industrialist and founder of Barrow
 Samuel Wassall – recipient of the Victoria Cross

War graves
The cemetery contains war graves of 109 Commonwealth service personnel (including one unidentified) of World War I and 83 (including five unidentified) of World War II, besides those of five foreign nationals (four Polish Air Force and one Netherlands Merchant Navy).

References

External links
 

Thorncliffe Cemetery
Thorncliffe
Thorncliffe Cemetery
Thorncliffe Cemetery
Commonwealth War Graves Commission cemeteries in England